Continental was the quarterly in-flight magazine for Continental Airlines. The magazine was previously published on monthly basis. The Pohly Company, a Boston-based customer communications company, was the long-term publisher. It was read by approximately 55 million passengers a year. On May 2, 2010, Continental agreed to a merger with United Airlines. Subsequently, Continental flights now issue the Hemispheres magazine.

References

External links
 Continental Magazine website

2010 disestablishments in Massachusetts
Monthly magazines published in the United States
Quarterly magazines published in the United States
Transport magazines published in the United States
Continental Airlines
Defunct magazines published in the United States
Inflight magazines
Magazines with year of establishment missing
Magazines disestablished in 2010
Magazines published in Boston